Canadian country music singer Paul Brandt has released five studio albums, two holiday albums, three extended plays, and 42 singles. Brandt debuted in 1996 with the single "My Heart Has a History", the first of five consecutive number ones in his native Canada. Both this and his next single, "I Do", made top 10 on the U.S. country charts. Although he charted only three more top 40 hits in the United States, he has continued to chart in Canada, including the number one all-genre hit "Canadian Man" in 2001 and the Gold-certified "I'm an Open Road" in 2015.

Studio albums

1990s

2000s

2010s

Holiday albums

Compilation albums

Extended plays

Box sets

Live albums

Singles

1990s

2000s

2010s

Other charted songs

Music videos

Notes

References

Discographies of Canadian artists
Country music discographies